Kerapa is an Iban longhouse in Betong, Sarawak, Malaysia. Neighbouring settlements include:

The recent installation of a photoelectric solar panel farm with batteries has opened up VSAT telecommunications (telephony and internet access) to the 500 people in this remote village, which is four hours by river from Betong.

References

Villages in Sarawak